Michael Joseph Keelty AO (born 13 July 1954) is a retired Australian Police Commissioner of the Australian Federal Police from 2001 to 2009. He was also the inaugural chairperson of the Australian Crime Commission, now known as the Australian Criminal Intelligence Commission.

Policing career
Keelty joined the Australian Capital Territory Police in 1974, which was subsequently merged with the Commonwealth Police in 1979, to create the Australian Federal Police (AFP). He became an Assistant Commissioner of the AFP in 1995 and Deputy Commissioner in 1998. Keelty was appointed Commissioner of Police of the Australian Federal Police on 2 April 2001 for an initial term of five years. He was the first Commissioner appointed from the ranks of the AFP.

Seconded to the then National Crime Authority, Keelty led the investigation into the then head of the South Australia Police Drug Squad Barry Malcolm Moyse.  Keelty remained at the NCA and led the investigation into Sydney underworld figure Leonard Arthur McPherson which saw Keelty embroiled into what became known as the Lauer/Pickering affair ultimately leading to the resignation of both the then NSW Police Minister and NSW Commissioner.  The McPherson investigation uncovered significant corruption in the NSW Police partly responsible for initiating the Wood Royal Commission.

Keelty returned to the AFP and was later taken off line to work with the Commonwealth Attorney General's Department with then barrister now NSW Justice Ian Harrison SC.  Keelty returned to the AFP and became the Assistant Commissioner Crime which also oversaw an expansion of the AFP's international presence to 26 countries and 32 cities around the world.  It is in this role that Keelty's international reputation grew as the AFP was drawn into United Nations and transnational crime fighting roles.

As Commissioner, Keelty oversaw the expansion of the AFP following the September 11 attacks in the United States of America later that year, with further expansion after the 2002 Bali bombings. The organisation quadrupled in size and budget in the eight-and-a-half years he served as Commissioner, taking on new roles such as the International Deployment Group – a body of some 1,200 officers serving in Afghanistan, Timor Leste, the Solomon Islands and Papua New Guinea and expanding the AFP's budget from A$370 million in 2001 to A$1.3 billion in 2009.

Major controversies in the AFP during his tenure included the investigation of Muhamed Haneef, an Indian-born doctor, on suspicion of involvement in the 2007 Glasgow International Airport attack, that saw a protracted investigation and release without charge, with later substantial compensation for loss of income, interruption of his professional work, and emotional distress largely based on the actions of the AFP.  Keelty also oversaw the AFP's involvement in the Bali Nine case, in which nine Australians were known to be carrying drugs to Indonesia, where they were arrested and jailed, with two later executed. The AFP never confirmed whether they had notified the Indonesian authorities, but said they were unable to arrest the nine before departure from Australia. Keelty has defended the AFP's role in the Bali Nine saga.

Keelty retired on 2 September 2009, on the 35th anniversary of commencing as a police officer having been instrumental in building the National Police Memorial located in Canberra.  Keelty rebuilt the Australian Institute of Police Management located at North Head, Manly NSW. Along with his Indonesian counterpart, General Dai'Bactier, Keelty built an international counter-terrorism training college at Semarang, Indonesia. While Commissioner, Keelty acquired 200 hectares of land at Majura ACT for future use as a UN-approved international training centre for Australian police serving overseas which also houses the AFP forensic science centre.

Career after policing
Since his retirement from the AFP, Keelty has become an Adjunct Professor at both the Australian National University and Charles Sturt University, undertaking research into policy implications of social networking for covert operations by police and security agencies. He is a member of the International Advisory Board for the Australian Research Council Centre for Excellence in Policing and Security and a member of the World Economic Forum's Global Council on Organised Crime. In February 2011, Keelty was appointed by the WA Government to lead the independent inquiry into the Perth Hills bushfires.  Keelty later conducted a review of the Margaret River WA bushfires.

In 2013 Keelty reviewed the Queensland Police, Corrections and Emergency Services portfolio for the Queensland Government and was appointed a part-time Corruption Commissioner on the QLD Crime and Corruption Commission following a review by former High Court Justice the Hon. Ian Callinan AC QC and Queensland University law academic Nicholas Aroney. Keelty was a member of the ARC funded Centre for Applied Philosophy and Public Ethics from 2014-2016 chaired by former High Court Justice the Hon. Michael Kirby AC CMG.

In 2013/14 Keelty was also asked to review the 2013 WA Senate Election which resulted in that state having to return to the polls following anomalies uncovered by Keelty.

From 2016-2017 Keelty conducted a classified review of the security of the Australian Defence Force following terrorist attacks on military bases overseas. In July 2017, Keelty was appointed the Chair of an expert advisory group in the Department of Prime Minister and Cabinet involved with the protection of children and young persons.

Following the bushfires in Bega Valley of NSW, the NSW Government appointed Keelty to review the interoperability of the NSW Emergency Services portfolio. Keelty was appointed by the Federal Minister for Agriculture the Hon. David Littleproud MP to examine the governance arrangements of the Northern Basin of the Murray-Darling delivering a report in December 2019.

On 1 August 2019 it was announced that a new position of Inspector-General for the Murray Darling Basin would be created and that from 1 October 2019, Keelty would act as the Interim Inspector-General as a non-statutory role for a period of 12 months, or until a statutory appointment is made. In March 2020, Keelty delivered a report of the impact of lower flows on state shares under the Murray-Darling Basin agreement.

In January 2020 the South Australian Premier, the Hon. Steven Marshall MP announced that Keelty would review the response to the 2019/2020 devastating bushfires that impacted Kangaroo Island and the Adelaide Hills.

Keelty has performed Chairman and Company Director roles on a number of private sector and charitable boards.

On 16 August 2020, the media reported that Keelty compromised an AFP investigation into alleged Australian war crimes in Afghanistan.  Keelty was reported to have passed information in June 2018 to Ben Roberts-Smith, that he was a figure of interest to police.  Keelty said he reached out to Roberts-Smith because he was asked to do so by a security adviser who previously worked for media billionaire Kerry Stokes, who is Roberts-Smith’s employer at the Seven Network.  Keelty has stated that he reached out to Roberts-Smith out of concern for Roberts-Smith's welfare. The media has reported many complaints from SAS soldiers (both former and current serving) that Roberts-Smith had allegedly participated in the execution of prisoners.  The media report acknowledges that Keelty is not accused of any wrong doing and related articles were described as "florid and slightly deranged attack on the former [AFP] Commissioner of Police" by Counsel representing Roberts-Smith.  The authors of the media articles are being sued for defamation.

Honours and awards

Keelty's academic qualifications include a Masters of Public Policy and Administration and a Graduate Certificate in Criminal Justice Education from the University of Virginia, USA; he is a graduate of the FBI National Academy, and is a Fellow of the Australian Institute of Management.

See also
Law enforcement in Australia

References

1954 births
Living people
Commissioners of the Australian Federal Police
People from the Australian Capital Territory
Recipients of the Australian Police Medal
Officers of the Order of Australia
Recipients of the Darjah Utama Bakti Cemerlang
Recipients of the Centenary Medal